American Seafoods Group, LLC (ASG) is an American seafood company. Based in Seattle, Washington, ASG owns and operates six large catcher-processor vessels that harvest and process on board fish caught in the U.S. waters of Alaska and the Pacific Northwest. American Seafoods Company is the largest harvester in the U.S. Bering Sea Alaska pollock fishery with approximately 45% of the catcher-processor market share.

American Seafoods Company is owned by American Seafoods Group Consolidated, LLC. Senior leaders of ASG include Einar Gustafsson, CEO; Kevin McMenimen, CFO; Rasmus Soerensen, Chief Commercial Officer. Inge Andreassen is President of American Seafoods Company, a subsidiary of American Seafoods Group.

History 

American Seafoods Company was founded by Kjell Inge Røkke in Seattle in 1988.
Following the passage of the American Fisheries Act in 1998, American Seafoods and seven other companies form the Pollock Conservation Cooperative. American Seafoods Company received 16.572% of Directed Pollock Fishery.
1999 – Bernt Bodal, Centre Partners Management, and two other investors bought American Seafoods Company and form American Seafoods Group 
2001 – American Seafoods Company opens and expands foreign sales offices
American Seafoods acquires three freezer long liners in purchase of Pacific Longline Company
ASC closes its cryoprotectant additive plant in Kent
2002 – American Seafoods Group acquires Southern Pride Catfish Company
2006 – Bernt Bodal leads management buyout of Centre Partners interest. Bernt Bodal becomes controlling equity owner
2008 – American Seafoods Group acquires catcher-processor Highland Light
American Seafoods Group sells Southern Pride Catfish Company
2010 – American Seafoods buys out CDQ group Coastal Villages. As part of transaction, American Seafoods transfers ownership of Pacific Longline Company and catcher processor Northern Hawk to Coastal Villages. Bernt Bodal becomes majority equity holder of American Seafoods
2013 – American Seafoods Group sells American Pride Seafoods to High Liner Foods, Inc.
2017 – American Seafoods Group names Mikel Durham CEO.
2022 - American Seafoods Group names Einar Gustafsson CEO

Products 
American Seafoods catches Alaska Pollock in the Eastern Bering Sea. From this catch, American Seafoods produces whole fillet blocks, surimi made from whole fillets and also from flesh recovered during processing, roe, minced pollock blocks, fish oil, white fish meal, and other "side stream" products such as stomachs, bone meal, fish skins, and milt.
Pacific (whiting) hake are caught and produced into Pin Bone Out (PBO), Deep Skinned (DS), and Pin Bone In (PBI) whole fillet blocks as well as surimi, headed and gutted fish, minced blocks, white fish meal, and fish oil. 
From its Yellowfin sole catches, American Seafoods produces frozen, whole, round fish and headed and gutted frozen blocks.
Pacific Cod are processed into fillet blocks, minced blocks, and headed and gutted products.

American Seafoods fleet

References

External links
Corporate Homepage

1988 establishments in Washington (state)
American companies established in 1988
Companies based in Seattle
Food and drink companies established in 1988
Seafood companies of the United States
Fishing companies